is a Japanese basketball player currently playing as a small forward for Fujitsu Red Wave. She represented Japan in the basketball competition at the 2016 Summer Olympics in Rio and won a silver medal with the Japanese national team at the 2020 Summer Olympics, held in Tokyo, Japan.

Her nickname is Earth (アース), referring to a high school teacher telling her that she wanted her to grow as big as the earth, and also taking the first and last characters of Amaterasu (Ōmikami), the Sun Goddess.

History 
Influenced by her older sister, Miyazawa started playing basketball during her first year of elementary school. Later, she joined the prestigious Kanazawa Comprehensive High School basketball team, where she became the team’s leading scorer and was appointed captain at the start of her sophomore year.

After graduating high school, Miyazawa joined ENEOS Sunflowers (at the time known as JX and later as JX-ENEOS) in 2012 and played with them for 9 seasons, before joining Fujitsu Red Wave in 2021.

Awards 

 W LEAGUE Best 5 (Forward): 2015, 2017, 2018, 2019, 2020
 Playoff MVP: 2019
 Playoff Best 5 (Forward): 2019
 Empress Cup MVP: 2018, 2019

References

External links

Japanese women's basketball players
Basketball players at the 2016 Summer Olympics
Basketball players at the 2020 Summer Olympics
Olympic basketball players of Japan
1993 births
Living people
Small forwards
Sportspeople from Kanagawa Prefecture
Olympic medalists in basketball
Olympic silver medalists for Japan
Medalists at the 2020 Summer Olympics
21st-century Japanese women